IFT may refer to: 
 "I.F.T." (Breaking Bad), an episode of Breaking Bad
 Federal Telecommunications Institute, a government agency of Mexico
 Implicit function theorem
 Independent Film Trust
 Information field theory
 Initial Flight Training
 Initiative for Free Trade
 Institute of Food Technologists
 Institute for Tourism Studies, Macao
 Interferential therapy
 International Federation of Translators
 Intraflagellar transport
 Inverse Fourier transform
 Inverse function theorem
 Irish Film Theatre